Miranje is a village in the municipality of Benkovac, Zadar County, Croatia.

Demographics
According to the 2011 census, the village of Miranje has 303 inhabitants. This represents 94.98% of its pre-war population according to the 1991 census.

The 1991 census recorded that 98.11% of the village population were ethnic Serbs (313/319), 0.62 % were Croats (2/319) while 1.25% were of other ethnic origin (4/319).

NOTE: The 1869 population data is included in the population data of Gornja Jagodnja, municipality of Polača.

Notable natives and residents

References

Benkovac
Populated places in Zadar County
Serb communities in Croatia